Louie Egan Lewis (July 20, 1893 – September 8, 1968) was an American politician, newspaper editor, and farmer.

Born on a farm in Christopher, Illinois, Lewis was a farmer, bookkeeper, and newspaper editor. He taught school and then owned the Sesser Herald and later the Christopher Progressive with his brother, Thurlow Girard Lewis. He was a Democrat. Lewis served on the Franklin County, Illinois board was president of the Sesser, Illinois School Board. Lewis then served in the Illinois House of Representatives from 1933 to 1939 and was Speaker of the House from 1937 to 1939. He then served as State Treasurer from 1939 to 1941. In 1940, he unsuccessfully ran as the Democratic nominee for lieutenant governor of Illinois. Lewis later worked for the Illinois Division of Motor Vehicles. He died of a heart attack in Christopher, Illinois.

Notes

1893 births
1969 deaths
People from Christopher, Illinois
Editors of Illinois newspapers
Educators from Illinois
County commissioners in Illinois
School board members in Illinois
State treasurers of Illinois
Speakers of the Illinois House of Representatives
Democratic Party members of the Illinois House of Representatives
20th-century American politicians
Journalists from Illinois
20th-century American journalists
American male journalists